South Park is a  county park in Allegheny County, Pennsylvania, United States. It is the second largest in the county's  network of nine parks.

The park offers a wave pool, golf course, ice skating rink, picnic groves, tennis courts, and miles of trails. The South Park Nature Center offers public nature and environmental education programs year round during the week and on the weekend. The Allegheny County Park Rangers also offer a wide variety of environmental education programs.

Beginning in the 1930s, South Park was used as the county fairgrounds and for more than thirty years attracted a half million people each season. By the late 1960s, farming in the county had declined and the fair was discontinued in 1971.

It is the location of the Oliver Miller Homestead, an important site of the Whiskey Rebellion.

References

Citations

Bibliography

External links 

 South Park website

Parks in the Pittsburgh metropolitan area
Parks in Allegheny County, Pennsylvania
Nature centers in Pennsylvania
1931 establishments in Pennsylvania
Protected areas established in 1931
County parks in the United States